Peter Wescombe (4 January 1932 – 25 November 2014) was a British diplomat, amateur archaeologist, historian and founding member of the Bletchley Park Trust.

References

1932 births
2014 deaths
Amateur archaeologists
British diplomats
Bletchley Park people